Vijetha Vikram is a 1987 Telugu-language film directed by S. S. Ravichandran and produced by T. Tirupathi Reddy on Samyutha Arts. It stars Venkatesh and Farah in the lead role, with music composed by Chakravarthy.
 The film was a flop at the box office.

Plot
Rudra Bhupathi (58), a dictator of an estate, treats all the villagers as slaves. Vikram (23), a young and energetic man, enters to the estate and opposes Rudra Bhupathi's wickedness and gets closer to the villagers. Usha (21), Rudra Bhupathi's only daughter, also likes Vikram and they fall in love. A mad woman, Bharathi (49), roams all over the estate without recognizing herself, one day Vikram realises that she is his mother and there is a link between her insanity and Rudra Bhupathi. Meanwhile, Shishupal, grandson of the adjacent estate owner returns from abroad and wants to marry Usha. Seeing Vikram as an obstacle, Shishupal plans an attack on him; in that quarrel Bharathi is injured and recovers her memory. Vikram asks his mother what happened, and she discusses their past.

Vikram's father Pratap Rao 50-35 was a forest officer who obstructed Rudra Bhupathi's illegal activities in the estate, so he killed him and also tried to kill Bharathi and Vikram. In that attack, Bharathi is injured keeping Vikram in a safe place, but she lost her memory. So Vikram seeks revenge against Rudra Bhupathi. Meanwhile, Shishupal rapes a village damsel, Gowri (19), and blames it on Vikram, so everyone, including Usha, believes it because Gowri lost consciousness and is unable to recognise her rapist. Usha prepares to marry Shishupal, at the time of marriage, Rudra Bhupathi discovers that Shishipal double-crossed him, and learns that he is not the estate owner's grandson, but a local goon. Meanwhile, Gowri regains consciousness and reveals the truth and sacrifices her life to protect Vikram. Shishupal and his men attack Rudra Bhupathi and the villagers and kidnap Usha, Vikram protects her and sees the end of Shishupal, even Rudra Bhupathi admits his mistake and movie ends with the marriage of Vikram and Usha.

Cast
Venkatesh as Vikram
Farah as Usha
Rao Gopal Rao as Rudra Bhupathi
Nutan Prasad as Bangaruraju
Sudhakar as Shishupal
Suthi Veerabhadra Rao as S.P. Pithal
Rallapalli as Bhajagovindam
Ranganath as Forest Officer Pratap Rao
Vankayala Satyanarayana as Vikram's grandfather
Chidatala Appa Rao as Villager
Poornima as Gowri
Sumitra as Bharathi
Y. Vijaya as Bangari

Soundtrack

Music composed by Chakravarthy. Music released on Lahari Music Company.

References

External links
 

Films scored by K. Chakravarthy
1980s Telugu-language films
Films directed by S. S. Ravichandra